Arjuna  is a river flowing in the Virudhunagar district of the Indian state of Tamil Nadu. it is a sacred river which formed during the period of the Pandavas. Arjuna one of the five Pandavas along this river to worship lord Shiva. There is a large Shiva temple named Kasi Viswanatha temple on the side of this river near Watrap.

The Anaikuttam Dam was built on this river in 1989.This dam is situated at sivakasi to virudhunagar highway.

References

See also 
List of rivers of Tamil Nadu

Rivers of Tamil Nadu
Virudhunagar district
Rivers of India

ta:அர்ஜுனா ஆறு